The ornate slider (Trachemys ornata) is turtle belonging to the genus Trachemys of the family Emydidae. It is found in Guerrero, Jalisco, Nayarit and Sinaloa in western Mexico.

Subspecies 
No subspecies

References 

Bibliography

Trachemys
Endemic reptiles of Mexico
Turtles of North America
Sinaloan dry forests
Reptiles described in 1830
Taxa named by John Edward Gray